Tiny Planets is a computer-animated children's television series co-produced by Sesame Workshop and Pepper's Ghost Productions. The concept was created by the late Nina Elias-Bamberger at Sesame Workshop with character designs by Ed Taylor. The television series consists of 65 five-minute, dialogue-free (and later narrated by Kim Goody, the singer of the theme song) episodes featuring two white-furred extraterrestrials travelling their universe and solving a specific problem each episode.

Plot

Deep in the heart of the Tiny Universe lies the North Planet where the main characters, Bing and Bong, make their home. These two explorers are catapulted to the surrounding worlds in their solar system on a flying white couch where they explore, learn about the inhabitants, develop friendships and have fun.

Characters
 Bing - Bing is older and much larger than Bong. His enormous appetite for exploring is dwarfed only by the endless supply of useful gadgets in an ever-present pouch. Wise and determined, he often takes the lead in adventures. Patient and thoughtful, he loves nothing more than a problem to be solved or a job to be done. He likes to help others and has an optimistic approach to life and its problems. He does not speak, but communicates with body language, expressive eyebrows, and humming sounds. He is voiced by Dashiell Tate.
 Bong - Bong, the younger and smaller one, is appealing, coy, impulsive, and a bundle lover of energy. Impish, playful, gregarious and incredibly compassionate, he is especially miserable when on bad terms with Bing. He loves to join in games and be the centre of attention. He does not speak but has an expressive face and a body, a high-pitched sound (which is cross between a grunt and a squeak), and a multi-decibel cry of joy. He is voiced by Kim Goody, the singer of the theme song.
 Halley - Halley is a small wide-eyed insect who is named after the comet who provides a running commentary from her flying saucer and "films" the action with a remote camera to provide a summary at the end of the episode. She is also voiced by Kim Goody, the singer of the theme song and was only featured in the Australian version on ABC Kids between 2001 and 2002, and the U.S. version of the series that was broadcast on Nickelodeon's Noggin cable channel between 2003 and 2004.
 Flockers - Flockers live on each of the Tiny Planets, each with its own distinctive population. More often than not, it is these social creatures that Bing & Bong are helping out of a jam. Whether it is cleaning out-of-reach windows or fortifying a house to withstand wind, Flockers are a perpetual source of problems begging to be solved. They do not speak, but communicate with body language and call sounds. Their design varies depending on the planet; they have either one or two heads and either one or two legs. Only a few have arms.
 Locals - Locals are smaller inhabitants of the planets and can appear in greater numbers than the Flockers but are just as dim. They are mostly globular in shape with blinking eyes and little antennae on top of their heads. They do not speak, but they communicate by bouncing, blinking and squeaking. On certain planets, the Locals are geometric shapes: squares, circles and triangles. Locals are always colourful, appealing and friendly.
 Robots - Robots are segmented spherical creatures with mechanical arms and either wheels or helicopter rotors. Found mostly on the Tiny Planet of Technology, like all robots, they are linear thinkers attempting to multitask. They are there to help but do not always take instructions well. Thus, they are a challenge and Bing and Bong learn to work with them to get the best out of them.

Settings

There are six Tiny Planets that Bing and Bong travel to, in addition to their Home Planet.

 Home Planet – Bing and Bong live inside the Home Planet. From here they set out every morning on a new adventure. It is an icy world, covered in snow-capped ice floes. Inside a giant crystal is Bing and Bong's home, decorated in a steampunk idiom, with much brass work. The main and most notable feature is the fuzzy white couch that doubles as both their bed and their means of intergalactic travel. Tethered to the Home Planet by a bungee cord it is launched into space by a monstrous catapult.
 Tiny Planet of Nature – Bing and Bong discover weather, plants and animals, the power of wind and the way rain turns to snow. This is a verdant and lush world, with trees, lakes, mountains and flowers. The seasons there are much like a temperate part of the Globe, with snow in winter, hot sun in summer and falling leaves in autumn.
 Tiny Planet of Technology – Bing and Bong design gadgets to discover the properties of springs, wheels, levers, pulleys, balance, forces, gears and structures. The planet consists of a massive detailed brass sphere, with four tethered satellites: two cubes and two spheres. The action takes place inside this planet, with an emphasis on structures and principles of physics.
 Tiny Planet of Self – Bing and Bong encounter fitness, cleanliness and healthy eating and learn more about themselves and others. This is a loose cluster of outcrops floating in a sunny atmosphere, linked by rows of stepping-stones. There are pagoda-like pavilions and a sports arena here, and local transport is by sky-boat. Lessons of health, feelings, and good manners are learned here.
 Tiny Planet of Sound – Bing and Bong join bands, play tubas, beat on drums and experiment with rhythm, harmony, pitch and acoustics. This is a rocky desert, with odd flora such as Pitch-Plants (extendible flutes that can be blown), maraca leaves and self-playing Tom-tom trees. Flockers and Locals often hold concerts here. The planet is blue from orbit, and is surrounded by a swarm of small asteroids which spiral from pole to pole.
 Tiny Planet of Light and Colour – Bing and Bong discover rainbows, shadows, animation and colour mixing. This is an environment where Bing and Bong discovers optical phenomena. Around the planet there is a wide, circular, semi-transparent band inlaid with parallel strips of ever-changing colours. The landscape is similar to a desert, and the most notable features are the bullet-shaped rock pillars with paint coloured spots on them.
 Tiny Planet of Stuff –  Bing and Bong explore groups of things and what they're made of. They play with patterns and numbers and sort things by colour, shape and sound. The planet is shaped like a gigantic Möbius strip and patterned like pink-and-blue graph paper; hence, this is where Bing and Bong solve problems involving arithmetic, logic and geometry.

Episodes
Nature:
 Seasons Machine
 Snow Problem
 Gone With the Wind
 It's Raining Bongs
 Winter Warm-Ups
On the Right Track
 Blown Away
 Egg-stra Large
 Body Talk
 Big and Small

Technology:
 Tip the Scales
 Spring Cleaning
 Tools, Glorious Tools
 Free Wheeling
 Slippery Slope
 Pedal Meddle
 Pivotal Points
 The Right Angle
 The Fisher Bing
 Strength in Girders

Self:
 Tuba Trouble
 Night Light, Sleep Tight
 Shower Power
 That's What Friends are For
 Flockercise
 Sweet Temptations
 Odd Bing Out
 Box of Tricks
 Keep Your Head
 Easy Rider
 Moving and Grooving
 Birthday Build-Up
 Be a Sport
 Love is All You Need
 Pooling Resources
 Everyone's a Winner

Sound:
 Highs and Lows
 Flower Power
 Jammin' Session
 A Chorus Line
 Desperately Seeking Silence
 Hear My Song
 Bing Bong Bell
 Found Sounds Orchestra
 Rhythm and Moods

Light and Color:
 Shadow Showdown
 True Colours
 Making Rainbows
 Flocker Flicker
 Contrasting Views
 The Light Fantastic
 3D or Not 3D?

Stuff:
 Patterns on Parade
 Picnic Poser
 Suits You
 Give Me Five
 Shapes Alive
 Magnificent Seven
 Shapes and Ladders
 Mirror Magic
 A Place for Everything
 Road Block
 What's Cooking?
 Colour Clues
 Ramping Up

Broadcast
Tiny Planets was shown on ITV in its country of origin, the UK. On December 1, 2002, the original version with English graphics premiered on Noggin in the United States as 5-minute segments between the shows, and it was expanded to a 30-minute show in early June 2004, and was shown on Noggin until April 9, 2006. It also aired on ABC in Australia, K-T.V. World in South Africa, BFBS in Germany as well as Belize, Falkland Islands, Gibraltar and Bosnia and Herzegovina, TV3 in New Zealand, Kids Central in Singapore, JimJam in Malta, e-Junior in the Emirates, TVB Pearl in Hong Kong as well as Macau, Family Channel and CBC in Canada. Localized versions were aired on Super RTL in Germany, NRK in Norway, HRT in Croatia, NHK in Japan, UBC Kids in Thailand, SBS in Korea, Astro Ria in Malaysia, Spacetoon in Indonesia, Italia 1 in Italy, Discovery Kids in Latin America, Televisa in Mexico and Minika Çocuk in Turkey.

Awards and nominations
The programme was nominated for several BAFTA awards. It won the 2002 BAFTA Interactive Children's Entertainment Award and was nominated for the 2001 BAFTA Interactive Award for Online Learning and the 2003 BAFTA Pre-school Animation Award. Additionally, a website based on the series was awarded the 2001 BAFTA Interactive Entertainment Website Award.

References

External links 

2000s American animated television series
2000s American children's television series
2000s American science fiction television series
2001 American television series debuts
2002 American television series endings
2000s British animated television series
2000s British children's television series
2000s British science fiction television series
2001 British television series debuts
2002 British television series endings
2000s preschool education television series
American children's animated space adventure television series
American children's animated science fiction television series
American computer-animated television series
American preschool education television series
Animated preschool education television series
British children's animated space adventure television series
British children's animated science fiction television series
British computer-animated television series
British preschool education television series
Television series by Sesame Workshop
ITV children's television shows
Television series set on fictional planets
English-language television shows
Animated television series without speech
Animated television series about extraterrestrial life